Maryina Roshcha is a station on the Bolshaya Koltsevaya line of the Moscow Metro, in the Maryina Roshcha District, between the station Savyolovskaya and station Rizhskaya. A transfer to the Lyublinsko–Dmitrovskaya line, via its Maryina Roshcha station, is planned.

Upon its opening, Maryina Roshcha will become the second-deepest station in the Moscow Metro, after Park Pobedy.  At a depth of  underground, Maryina Roshcha has four  escalators, the longest escalators in Moscow.

History 

The line was first conceived in 1985, with construction on the line beginning in 2011.

General contractor Mosinzhproekt held an international contest to determine the ar

chitectural design of the station, with the citizens of Moscow voting in 2017 to determine the winner amongst the finalists.  The winning design, by AI Architects, focuses on porcelain and rounded shapes.

The station is one of 14 Moscow Metro stations scheduled to open in 2023.

Gallery

Notes

References 

Bolshaya Koltsevaya line
Moscow Metro stations